WASP-79b is an extrasolar planet orbiting the star CD-30 1812. This planet is in the constellation Eridanus, and is about 810 light-years from Earth.

The planet WASP-79b is named Pollera. The name was selected in the NameExoWorlds campaign by Panama, during the 100th anniversary of the IAU. A pollera is the traditional costume the woman wears in the El Punto, a Panamanian dance.

Host star
WASP-79, or CD-30 1812, is a F-type dwarf star located at 240 parsecs (810 light years) away from Earth. Its effective temperature is 6,600 K, making it hotter than the Sun.

The star WASP-79 is named Montuno. Montuno is the traditional costume the man wears in the “El Punto”, a Panamanian dance.

Characteristics
WASP-79b is a very large hot jupiter that is among the largest exoplanets discovered although its size is uncertain.

The planet is orbiting the host star at nearly-polar orbit with respect to star's equatorial plane, inclination being equal to −95.2°.

In 2019 and 2020, the transmission spectra of WASP-79b were taken utilizing HST and Spitzer Space Telescope, with best fit being the hazy atmosphere containing about 1% water and traces of Iron(I) hydride. The presence of iron hydride was confirmed in 2021, along with tentative detection of vanadium oxide. Also, in 2022 an atmospheric sodium has been detected.

See also
GQ Lupi b
WASP-17b
TrES-4b

References

Exoplanets discovered in 2012
Giant planets
Hot Jupiters
Transiting exoplanets
Eridanus (constellation)
Exoplanets discovered by WASP
Exoplanets with proper names